Michael Hughes may refer to:

Sports
 Mickey Hughes (1866–1931), American MLB baseball pitcher of the 1880s and 1890s
 Mike Hughes (footballer) (1940–2018), Welsh footballer
 Mike Hughes (rower) (born 1959), Canadian rower
 Mickey Hughes (boxer) (born 1962), English boxer of the 1980s and 1990s
 Michael Hughes (basketball) (born 1998), American basketball player
 Michael Hughes (footballer) (born 1971), Northern Irish footballer
 Mike Hughes (wrestler) (born 1974), Canadian wrestler
 Mike Hughes (American football) (born 1997), American football player

Other
 Michael Hughes (industrialist) (1752–1825), Welsh industrialist
 Michael Hughes-Young, 1st Baron St Helens (1912–1980), British army officer and politician
 Mike Hughes (daredevil) (1956–2020), American daredevil, amateur rocketeer, and flat Earth proponent
 Michael Anthony Hughes (born 1988), missing person who was abducted in 1994
 Michael Hughes (serial killer), American serial killer
 Michael Hughes (priest) (died 1680), Welsh Anglican priest
 Mikey Hughes, contestant in Big Brother UK
 Michael Hughes, member of English folk group The Young'uns